Bourne Academy is an 11 to 18 mixed comprehensive school and a co-educational academy located in Bourne, Lincolnshire, England. It is one of two secondary schools, both co-educational, in the town, the other being Bourne Grammar School. Bourne Academy is a part of the South Lincolnshire Academies Trust (SLAT), together with Spalding Academy, Spalding and Giles Academy, Boston.

Bourne Academy is situated on Edinburgh Crescent, to the north of the town next to the Leisure Centre.

The school badge represents the Wake knot, a heraldic device referring to the Wake family, previous Lords of the Manor of Bourne, and similar to the carrick bend.

History
The school was originally part of the Star Lane Board School, which is now the Bourne Abbey Primary Academy, a primary school.

Following the Education Act 1944 the secondary school was divided out and moved to temporary premises at a separate site in 1946.

In July 1958 the first permanent buildings were opened at Edinburgh Crescent, and the school adopted the name Bourne County Secondary School.

In 1987 the name was changed to the Robert Manning School in honour of Robert Mannyng of Bourne (c. 1275 – c. 1338).

The sixth form started in 1988, and in 1989 extension premises were opened by Kenneth Baker, Secretary of State for Education.

In 1999 the school attained Technology College status and the name changed again, to Robert Manning Technology College.

Specialist school
In January 2007 it was announced that, in recognition of its excellence, the school had been invited by the government to apply to take on a second speciality in Vocational Education, and that its application was successful. Due to the school's new speciality, the Governors decided to change the name once more, to the Robert Manning College.

Academy
Due to a successful application, as of the 2011-2012 academic year, Robert Manning is an academy. In recognition of this, the school's name was changed to Bourne Academy.

See also
 List of schools in the East Midlands
 Bourne Grammar School
 St. George's College of Technology, a similar school in Sleaford

References

External links
 College website
 Rex Needle Bourne website article on the College
 Specialist Schools and Academies Trust website

Video clips
 Video montage of the school

Educational institutions established in 1946
Secondary schools in Lincolnshire
1946 establishments in England
Academies in Lincolnshire
Bourne, Lincolnshire